What a Night is a 1977 album by Tom Jones on Epic Records produced by Gordon Mills. The album was promoted by Epic as showing a more sensitive and thoughtful side to the singer.

Track listing
"What a Night"
"We Don't Live Here"
"No One Gave Me Love"
"Day to Day Affair"
"If This Is Love"
"I Wrote This Song"
"That's Where I Belong"
"Easy to Love"
"The Heart"
"Ramblin' Man"

References

1977 albums
Tom Jones (singer) albums